Anna Graves is an American voice actress best known for her voice-over work on multiple video games and commercials, along with her work on the animated series Star Wars: The Clone Wars.

Filmography

Television

Video games

References

External links 

 
 

American television actresses
American video game actresses
American voice actresses
Living people
21st-century American actresses
Year of birth missing (living people)